N. intermedia  may refer to:
 Navia intermedia, a plant species endemic to Venezuela
 Nephroselmis intermedia, an alga species in the genus Nephroselmis
 Neurospora intermedia, a mold species in the genus Neurospora 
 Nycteris intermedia, the intermediate slit-faced bat, a mammal species found in west and central Africa

See also
 Intermedia (disambiguation)